Mst. Shirin Neyeem is a Bangladesh Awami League politician and the former Member of Bangladesh Parliament from a reserved seat.

Early life
Nayeem was born on 24 April 1959 and she has no formal education.

Career
Neyeem was elected to parliament from reserved seat as a Bangladesh Awami League candidate in 2014.

References

Awami League politicians
Living people
1959 births
Women members of the Jatiya Sangsad
10th Jatiya Sangsad members
21st-century Bangladeshi women politicians
21st-century Bangladeshi politicians